The 1966 United States Senate election in South Dakota took place on November 8, 1966. Incumbent Republican Senator Karl E. Mundt ran for re-election to his fourth term. He was challenged in the Republican primary by a John Birch Society member, but easily turned away the challenge. In the general election, he faced State Representative Donn Wright, the Democratic nominee. Owing in large part to the Republican landslide taking place nationwide, Mundt defeated Wright by an unprecedented margin.

Democratic Primary
State Representative Donn Wright from Aurora County announced that he would run against Mundt on April 18, 1966, the only Democratic candidate to do so. As Wright was the only candidate to file for the nomination, he won the primary unopposed and the race was removed from the primary election ballot.

Republican Primary

Candidates
 Karl E. Mundt, incumbent U.S. Senator
 Richard B. Murphy, attorney, John Birch Society member

Results

General election

Results

References

South Dakota
1966
1966 South Dakota elections